Tylencholaimidae is a family of nematodes belonging to the order Dorylaimida.

Genera

Genera:
 Bullanema Sauer, 1968
 Chitwoodielloides Ahmad & Araki, 2003
 Chitwoodiellus Jimenez Guirado & Pea-Santiago, 1992

References

Nematodes